Amelunxen is a surname of:
	
 Rudolf Amelunxen (1888–1969), German politician of the Zentrum and the 1st Minister President of North Rhine-Westphalia 
 Hubertus von Amelunxen (born 1958), German  philosopher, art historian, editor, curator, photography critic

Surnames
Surnames of German origin